The NAACP Theatre Awards are a NAACP member voted awards started in 1991 and presented annually by the Beverly Hills-Hollywood branch of the NAACP to honor outstanding people of color in theater. The ceremonies usually take place in the Los Angeles area following the presentation ceremonies of the NAACP Image Awards. There are also honorary awards: the President's Award, the Trailblazer Award, the Spirit Award, the Community Service Award, and The Lifetime Achievement Award.

Award ceremonies

Award categories

Equity
 Best Choreography
 Best Costumes
 Best Director
 Best Director of a Musical
 Best Ensemble Cast
 Best Lead Female
 Best Lead Male
 Best Lighting
 Best Music Director
 Best Playwright
 Best Producer
 Best Set Design
 Best Sound
 Best Supporting Female
 Best Supporting Male

Local
 Best Choreography
 Best Costumes
 Best Director
 Best Director of a Musical
 Best Ensemble Cast
 Best Lead Female
 Best Lead Male
 Best Lighting
 Best Music Director
 Best Playwright
 Best Producer
 Best Set Design
 Best Sound
 Best Supporting Female
 Best Supporting Male

Special awards
 Community Service Award
 Lifetime Achievement Award
 President's Award
 Spirit Award
 Trailblazer Award

References

External links
 

 
African-American theatre
American theater awards
Awards established in 1991
Awards honoring African Americans
NAACP
1991 establishments in the United States